Eduard Kubat (1891–1976) was a German film producer, who also directed two films. During the Nazi era he was employed by Terra Film, but following the Second World War he went to work for DEFA, the state-controlled company of East Germany.

Selected filmography

Production manager
 The Lost Shoe (1923)
 The Other Woman (1924)
 The False Step (1939)
 Allez Hopp (1946)
 Bürgermeister Anna (1950)

Producer
 Victor and Victoria (1933)
 What Men Know (1933)
 Alarm in Peking (1937)
 Doctor Crippen (1942)
 Sky Hounds (1942)
 The Golden Spider (1943)
 When the Young Wine Blossoms (1943)
 1-2-3 Corona (1948)
 Friday the Thirteenth (1949)

Director
 The Call of the Sea (1951)
 Swings or Roundabouts (1953)

References

Bibliography
 Richards, Jeffrey. Visions of Yesterday. Routledge & Kegan Paul, 1973.

External links

1891 births
1976 deaths
Film people from Essen